Alpine skiing at the 2015 Winter Universiade was held at the Universiade Slope in the Sierra Nevada Ski Station, Granada, from February 6 to February 14, 2015.

Men's events

Women's events

Medal table

References

External links
Alpine skiing results at the 2015 Winter Universiade.
Results book

 
Alpine skiing
Winter Universiade
2015
International winter sports competitions hosted in Spain